Damon Coleman, better known by his stage name Omen, is an American rapper and record producer from Chicago, Illinois. He is signed to J. Cole's Dreamville Records and Interscope Records. His debut studio album Elephant Eyes, was released on July 21, 2015.

Musical career

2010–2013
In 2010, Omen released his first mixtape, Delayed. The following year, he released critically acclaimed mixtape, Afraid of Heights. The mixtape includes guest features from J. Cole and Kendrick Lamar, among others.

2014–present
In 2014, Omen then appeared on the Dreamville compilation mixtape Revenge of the Dreamers. That mixtape was released in celebration of Dreamville's partnership with Interscope Records.

On July 21, 2015, Omen's debut album, Elephant Eyes, was released after a few setbacks and date changes. During the Spring and Summer of 2015 Omen, was a part of the J. Cole's "2014 Forest Hills Drive" Tour with other acts Bas, Cozz, Pusha T, Jhene Aiko, Jeremih, YG, Big Sean, which brought him across North America as well as Europe. In the Fall of 2015 he went on his own Elephant Eyes Tour hitting Los Angeles, as well as, Boston, New York and his Hometown Chicago.

Discography

Studio album

Mixtapes

Compilation albums

Singles

As lead artist

Guest appearances

References

Living people
American hip hop record producers
Interscope Records artists
Dreamville Records artists
People from Chicago
Rappers from Chicago
21st-century American rappers
Record producers from Illinois
African-American male rappers
21st-century American male musicians
21st-century African-American musicians
1982 births